Palliduphantes bayrami is a species of sheet weaver spider found in the Karaman Province of Turkey. It was described by Demir, Topçu & Seyyar in 2008.  It is named in honor of arachnologist Dr. Abdullah Bayram.

Description
It was discovered in Manaspoli Cave near humid clay where it spins its web among loose stones. This cave is the only known locality that this spider inhabits.

References

Linyphiidae
Spiders described in 2008
Spiders of Asia